Optik may refer to:
 Optik (journal), a scientific journal of optics
 Optik Software, a game developer
 Optik TV from Telus.